Stabsbootsmann  (StBtsm or SB) is the second highest Non-commissioned officer (NCO) rank in the German Navy. It is grouped as OR8 in NATO, equivalent to First Sergeant,  Master Sergeant, or Senior Chief Petty Officer in the US Armed forces, and to Warrant Officer Class 2 in the British Army and Royal Navy.

In navy context NCOs of this rank were formally addressed as Herr/ Frau Stabsbootsmann also informally / short Staber.

History
In 1938, grades were introduced by the German Kriegsmarine depending on the particular career as follows:
Boatswain (de: Bootsmann): Stabsoberbootsmann (Staff senior boatswain)
Steersman (de: Steuermann): Stabsobersteuermann (Staff senior steersman)
Engineman (de: Maschinist):  Stabsobermaschinist (Staff senior engineman)

These grades were equivalent to the German Wehrmacht ranks Stabsfeldwebel and Stabswachmeister, or the Waffen-SS grade Stabsscharführer.

Grades Stabsfeldwebel and Stabswachmeister have been used in the GDR National People's Army until 1990 as well. The equivalent in the Volksmarine was Stabsmeister.

The sequence of ranks (top-down approach) in that particular group is as follows:
Unteroffiziere mit Portepee
OR-9: Oberstabsbootsmann / Oberstabsfeldwebel
OR-8: Stabsbootsmann / Stabsfeldwebel
OR-7: Hauptbootsmann / Hauptfeldwebel
OR-6a: Oberbootsmann / Oberfeldwebel
OR-6b: Bootsmann / Feldwebel

Equivalent in other NATO countries 
  – Premier-maître chef/ Eerste meesterchef
  – Chief Petty Officer 2nd Class
  – Stožerni narednik
  – Seniorsergent
  – Premier maître
  – Αρχικελευστής/ Archikelefstis
  – no equivalent
  – capo di seconda classe
  – no equivalent
  – no equivalent
  – Chorąży marynarki
  – Sargento-chefe
  – Brigada
  – Warrant Officer Class 2
  – Senior Chief Petty Officer

See also
 Ranks of the German Bundeswehr
 Rank insignia of the German Bundeswehr

References

Naval ranks of Germany